Garakupi is a village in the Hasnabad CD Block in Basirhat subdivision of North 24 Parganas district, in the state of West Bengal, India. It is a major market centre.

Etymology

Garakupi is a Bengali word adopted from old man many years ago. Garakupi had its earlier name "Garapota" but it is no more today. But something can be understood by this word pota is meant that something digging into soil and kupi has  the same  meaning to pota. So Gara may be a thing and it is dug into soil.

Geography
It is one of 75 villages in Hasnabad Block.

Demographics
As per the 2011 Census of India, Garakupi had a total population of 2,029, of which 1,036 (51%) were males and 993 (49%) were females. Population below 6 years was 215. The total number of literates in Garakupi was 1,275 (70.29% of the population over 6 years).

Education
Garakupi High School(H.S) is a higher secondary school situated on the breast of Garakupi. It is run by State Government and affiliated with WBBSE and WBCHSE.

The market

Garakupi  is divided  into two parts, one is North side and other is South side. These two parts divided by the branch of Bidyadhari River. It was  merely a small residential place for people  but it has been changed for both market and living place. The market was very  small then before 1990 because the number of shops was so few but today it is a large market after increasing many shops and buildings and is one of the popular markets in this area. It forms a large range area about 1.2 km. From the start to end the market is arranged in a very expansive style.

Type of market
It is a market for goods and essential products for people, daily buying and selling market. The people from nearby sites come to this market and buying and selling system goes on through this way.
A wide range of products are available here including such as raw materials, all type of vegetables, stationery product and so on.

Fish stall
Garakupi is a market where fish can be seen to sell at any time. For fish a separate stall selected permanently by the marketing committee. All type of fish available in this separated stall such as: Ilish, Grass carp, Koy, Silver carp, Tilapia, Catla, Chingri  and so on.
Chingri,  Tilapia and Rui Fish commonly  sell here and the popular fish ever eaten in nearby village.

Vegetable market
Vegetable market is an  organ of Garakupi  Market but is separated like Fish stall. The vegetables which buyers get are taken from Vegetable land where pure vegetable grows. There are many  sellers who plant these type of vegetable on their own vegetable land and Kitchen garden and bring them in the market for selling. These vegetables  demand mostly and buyers try to purchase them.
The vegetables which are available here such of them : Carrot, Brinjal, Potato, Onion, Cabbage, Bean, Cauliflower, Chayote(PePe), Chilli, Gherkin, Green Peas, Raw banana, Pumpkin, Ridge Gourd, Sweet Potato, Tomato, Swiss Chard(Laal saak), Bitter melon, Okra, Shallot(Cut onion)  and many others.

Upper market
Upper market means the market on road side. About 1.2 km long the building (shops) are spreading two sides on the road, some are completed and some are incomplete but construction going on. But it has been a major junction just after gradually  developed. The upper market comes to face to one  another building as the two sides of the road gaped with  many buildings. There are many type of shops as stationary stores, Grocery shops (Mudikhana), Doctor's Clinic, Bookstall or Library, Tea house, Electronic repairing shop, fast food restaurant, cloth shop, enterprise shop, and barber shop.

The market picture gallery

References

Villages in North 24 Parganas district